Kill Pinochet (known early in the production stage as ) is a 2020 internationally co-produced thriller drama film directed by Juan Ignacio Sabatini. The film is based on the attempted assassination of Augusto Pinochet that occurred in September 1986.

Plot 
The plot concerns the development by members of Manuel Rodríguez Patriotic Front of the plan to kill Chilean dictator Augusto Pinochet in Cajón del Maipo in 1986 (the so-called 'Operación Siglo XX').

Cast

Production 
Kill Pinochet is  debut as a director of a fiction feature film. He penned the screenplay alongside Enrique Videla and Pablo Paredes. A joint Chile–Argentina–Spain international co-production, Kill Pinochet was produced by Villano alongside DDRio Estudio, Leyenda Cine, Potenza Producciones and Fusileros la película AIE, in association with Primate Lab and with support from Fondo de Fomento Audiovisual, CORFO, INCAA, ICAA and Ibermedia. Shooting locations included Santiago and Valparaíso.

Release 
In the wake of the health situation of Chile caused by the COVID-19 pandemic, the film had an online pre-screening at the streaming platform Punto Play on 12 November 2020, with a streaming window at Punto Ticket scheduled to last until 6 December 2020. It also screened at the 46th Huelva Ibero-American Film Festival on 14 November 2020, and it was theatrically released in Spain on 20 November 2020.

Awards and nominations 

|-
| align = "center" rowspan = "2" | 2021 || 8th Platino Awards || colspan = "2" | Best Ibero-American Debut Film ||  || 
|-
| 29th EnergaCamerimage Film Festival || Director's Debut Competition || ||  || align = "center" | 
|}

See also 
 List of Spanish films of 2020

References

External links 
 Kill Pinochet at ICAA's Catálogo de Cinespañol

2020 films
2020 thriller drama films
Chilean thriller drama films
Argentine thriller drama films
Spanish thriller drama films
2020s Spanish-language films
Films set in Chile
Films set in 1986
Films about the Chilean military dictatorship
2020s Spanish films
2020s Argentine films
2020s Chilean films